Mexican Spitfire refers to a series of eight comedy films released by RKO Pictures between 1940 and 1943 starring Lupe Vélez and Leon Errol. The movies featured the character of Carmelita Lindsay (Lupe Vélez), a sympathetic and temperamental Mexican singer who leaves her career and native country to meet Dennis Lindsay (Donald Woods in the first three, Charles "Buddy" Rogers in the next three, and Walter Reed in the final two), an elegant and handsome American businessman. 

The series began with the 1939 film The Girl from Mexico, which first introduced Carmelita and the other characters of the series. The premise is based mainly on the culture shock facing Carmelita in her new married life, especially when she gets to know the family and friends of her husband, including his stuffy Aunt Della (Elizabeth Risdon). In the earliest entries, the Lindsays are engaged or newly wed, and Aunt Della strongly disapproves of her son's choice; she schemes to reunite Dennis with his former flame, Elizabeth (Linda Hayes).

Carmelita finds in her husband's uncle, Matthew "Uncle Matt" Lindsay (Leon Errol), a friend and adventurous accomplice. Matt is sympathetic to Carmelita, and they often share confidences. They both get into trouble from situations usually caused by their scheming and by the volatile temperament of Carmelita.

The second picture, Mexican Spitfire, introduces the foggy Lord Basil Epping (also Leon Errol), a British distiller with a fondness for tippling. Matt is forced to impersonate the eccentric Lord Epping (also Errol), almost always when he's elsewhere on the premises. The complications confuse both Epping's business manager (Cecil Kellaway) and wife Lady Epping (Lydia Bilbrook). Errol's masquerade became the focal point of the series, and all of the ensuing films had Uncle Matt and Lord Epping in mistaken-identity situations.

The director was always Leslie Goodwins and one of the writers was usually Charles E. Roberts, both veterans of RKO's short-subject comedy unit. Goodwins and Roberts staged the action very broadly, allowing both Vélez and Errol to improvise freely. Errol in particular offers spontaneous bits, and Vélez openly breaks up laughing on camera. Both cast and crew were very close-knit, and the atmosphere on the set was always upbeat. At the end of the third film, Mexican Spitfire Out West, hotel house detective Grant Withers shows Leon Errol a moose head and asks, "What should I do with this?" Errol improvises a response and the crew breaks out laughing (part of which can be heard in the background). Director Goodwins left the scene in the picture.

Despite the constant, predictable repetitions of the basic plotline -- or perhaps because of them -- the Mexican Spitfire series remained popular with moviegoers through 1943. After Lupe Vélez's death, the production unit stayed together to produce domestic farces with surviving co-star Leon Errol. The Errol features lapsed in 1945, although Errol reprised the "Uncle Matt Lindsay" character in the RKO musical comedy Riverboat Rhythm (1946) and the "Lord Epping" character in the two-reel comedy Lord Epping Returns (1951).

Films in the series
The Girl from Mexico (1939)
Mexican Spitfire (1940)
Mexican Spitfire Out West (1940)
The Mexican Spitfire's Baby (1941)
Mexican Spitfire at Sea (1942)
Mexican Spitfire Sees a Ghost (1942)
Mexican Spitfire's Elephant (1942)
Mexican Spitfire's Blessed Event (1943)

Each film is not simply a comedic film, but a satire of the cultural shock and stereotypes of the Mexican people (and Latin American people in general) in the American society at the time.

Characters

 Names in white rectangles show which actors appeared in each film. A dark grey rectangle indicates that the character did not appear in that film.

In popular culture
Mexican Spitfire has been compared and contrasted to I Love Lucy. Both feature Latino-Anglo couples, with a sweet troublemaker wife. Lucy reverses the racial makeup, but outbursts of frustrated Spanish from the Latino partner remain a theme.

References

Comedy film series
Film series introduced in 1939